The 2019 ICC Men's T20 World Cup Qualifier was a cricket tournament held during October and November 2019 in the United Arab Emirates to determine which teams would qualify for the 2021 ICC Men's T20 World Cup tournament. The six teams finishing highest in the qualifier tournament joined Sri Lanka and Bangladesh in the first group stage of the 2020 ICC Men's T20 World Cup. The tournament formed part of the ICC T20 World Cup Qualifier series, with the Netherlands winning the final.

In April 2018, the International Cricket Council (ICC) granted full international status to Twenty20 men's matches played between member sides from 1 January 2019 onwards. Therefore, all the matches in the Regional Finals and the Qualifier itself, were played as full Twenty20 Internationals (T20Is). In July 2019, the ICC suspended Zimbabwe Cricket, with the team barred from taking part in ICC events, which put their participation in the tournament in doubt. The following month, with Zimbabwe banned from taking part in international cricket tournaments, the ICC named Nigeria as their replacement in the tournament.

Papua New Guinea were the first team to qualify for the 2020 ICC Men's T20 World Cup from the tournament, after they won Group A, finishing above the Netherlands on net run rate. It was the first time that Papua New Guinea had qualified for a World Cup in any format. Ireland became the second team to qualify when they won Group B, also on net run rate. Both teams also advanced to the playoff section of the qualifier. They were joined by the Netherlands, Namibia and Scotland from Group A, and Oman, the United Arab Emirates and Hong Kong from Group B.

In the first qualifier match in the playoffs, the Netherlands qualified for the T20 World Cup when they beat the United Arab Emirates by eight wickets, after the UAE only scored 80 runs in their innings. The second qualifier match saw Namibia advance to their first T20 World Cup after beating Oman by 54 runs. Scotland beat tournament hosts the United Arab Emirates in the third qualifier by 90 runs to secure their place in the Men's T20 World Cup. The final qualifier match saw Oman become the last team to qualify for the Men's T20 World Cup, after they narrowly beat Hong Kong by 12 runs.

Scotland beat Oman by five wickets to win the fifth-place playoff match. In the first semi-final, the Netherlands beat Ireland by 21 runs to advance to the final. They were joined in the final with Papua New Guinea, after they beat Namibia by 18 runs in the second semi-final. Ireland beat Namibia by 27 runs to win the third-place playoff. The final saw the Netherlands beat Papua New Guinea by seven wickets to win the tournament. Namibia's captain, Gerhard Erasmus, was named the player of the tournament.

Teams and qualifications
Sub-regional qualification groups began on 26 February 2018 in Argentina. In the Americas group, both the Cayman Islands and Bermuda registered wins against Argentina. A total of 61 Associate Member teams out of originally scheduled 62 teams competed. Of these teams, 25 of them progressed to the regional finals in 2019, with the top seven teams progressing to the qualifier tournament. They were joined by the top six teams from the 2015 qualifier that were outside the top ten places in the ICC T20I Championship by the cut-off date of 31 December 2018, and the tournament host.

ICC T20I Championship
Host nation, Australia, and the nine best teams (according to the ICC T20I Championship ranking of 31 December 2018) who played in the last edition of ICC Men's T20 World Cup qualified for the final tournament directly. The remaining six entrants from the last tournament competed in the Regional Qualifiers of the World Cup qualifying tournaments. Of the teams in the ICC T20I Championship ranking, initially the United Arab Emirates and Nepal could only qualify through regional competitions. However, in March 2019, the ICC announced that the UAE would host the qualifier tournament, resulting in their automatic qualification. Later the same month, the ICC released the match schedule for all the Regional Finals, with the UAE omitted from the fixture list for the Asia Regional Final. The number of teams that could qualify from the Asia Regional Final was also reduced from two to one.

The final rankings for automatic qualification as of 31 December 2018 were as follows:

<noinclude>

Regional qualifications
62 teams were originally scheduled to compete in 12 regional qualification groups during 2018 across five regions, with 61 taking part. The top 25 teams progressed to five regional finals in 2019, with eight teams progressing to the 2019 qualifier tournament. The host nation of each sub-regional group and regional final groups are shown in bold.  All the sub-regional stage matches in the European section were held in the Netherlands.

Squads

UAE squad
Ahead of the tournament, Mohammad Naveed was withdrawn from the UAE's squad, with Ahmed Raza named as captain in his place. Qadeer Ahmed and Shaiman Anwar were also dropped from the UAE's squad, with Waheed Ahmed, Darius D'Silva and Junaid Sidique added to their squad. Two days before the start of the tournament, the ICC confirmed that the three players dropped from the UAE's squad had all been suspended after they had breached cricket's anti-corruption rules. Mohammad Naveed and Shaiman Anwar were believed to be planning to fix matches in the tournament, while Qadeer Ahmed was approached to fix a match during the UAE's tour of Zimbabwe in April 2019. On 21 October 2019, Ashfaq Ahmed became the fourth UAE cricketer to be suspended by the ICC. Ahmed had played in the first two matches for the team in the tournament.

On 21 October 2019, Ghulam Shabber, the UAE's wicket-keeper, did not show up for the pre-match meeting ahead of the fixture against Hong Kong. It later transpired that Shabber had left the country without an explanation, before being traced to Pakistan. On 26 October 2019, in an interview for The National, Shabber denied any involvement with corruption and announced his retirement from cricket, citing the poor remuneration for playing. He said that "if there is something with regards to anti-corruption, I am ready to cooperate in Pakistan. But I have decided cricket is not in my future".

Following the conclusion of the group stage, the ICC's Event Technical Committee approved two replacements in the UAE's squad. Faizan Asif replaced Ashfaq Ahmed and Vriitya Aravind was named as Ghulam Shabber's replacement. On 30 October 2019, the Emirates Cricket Board (ECB) confirmed that they had suspended Shabber for absconding, and that he was part of the ICC's anti-corruption investigation. In March 2021, Mohammad Naveed and Shaiman Anwar were both found guilty of corruption, with each player given an eight-year ban from all cricket, backdated to 16 October 2019. In July 2021, the ICC also handed eight-year bans to Amir Hayat and Ashfaq Ahmed for violating the anti-corruption code. Their bans were both backdated to 13 September 2020. In September 2021, the ICC also issued a four-year ban to Ghulam Shabber, following the conclusion of their anti-corruption investigation.

Other changes
In September 2019, ahead of the 2019–20 Oman Pentangular Series, Hong Kong's Babar Hayat declared that he was no longer available to play for Hong Kong. Brothers Tanveer Ahmed and Ehsan Nawaz also withdrew themselves for selection.

Anantha Krishna was ruled out of Singapore's squad after suffering an injury in a training session. He was replaced by Aahan Gopinath Achar. On 24 October 2019, the ICC announced that the bowling actions of Abiodun Abioye (Nigeria), Tom Sole (Scotland) and Selladore Vijayakumar (Singapore) were all found to be illegal. They were all suspended from bowling in international cricket matches until an assessment shows that their bowling action is legal.

Ahead of the playoff matches, Dylan Budge replaced Ollie Hairs in Scotland's squad, after Hairs suffered a fracture in his foot. Ireland also made a replacement, with Barry McCarthy coming into their squad, replacing David Delany, who was ruled out with a knee injury.

Match officials
In October 2019, the ICC named the officials for the tournament, with G. S. Lakshmi becoming the first woman to be named as a referee at an ICC event.

Umpires

 Roland Black
 Chris Brown
 Lyndon Hannibal
 Sam Nogajski
 Ahmed Shah Pakteen
 Allahudien Paleker

 Sundaram Ravi
 Ahsan Raza
 Rashid Riaz
 Sharfuddoula
 Alex Wharf
 Raveendra Wimalasiri

Referees
The ICC also named three match referees for the tournament.

 Jeff Crowe
 G. S. Lakshmi
 Gerrie Pienaar

Warm-up matches
Ahead of the main tournament, each team played two warm-up matches.

Group stage

Group A

Group B

Playoffs

Bracket

Qualifier 1

Qualifier 2

Qualifier 3

Qualifier 4

5th Place Playoff

Semifinal 1

Semifinal 2

3rd Place Playoff

Final

Final standings
These were the final standings following the conclusion of the tournament. The top six places were used for seeding purposes for the 2020 Men's T20 World Cup.

 Qualified for the 2021 ICC Men's T20 World Cup.

Notes

References

External links
 Series home at ESPN Cricinfo

2019 in Emirati cricket
2021 ICC Men's T20 World Cup
International cricket competitions in 2019–20
ICC Men's T20 World Cup Qualifier
International cricket competitions in the United Arab Emirates
ICC
ICC